Popsicle is a Good Humor-Breyers brand of ice pop consisting of flavored, colored ice on a stick.

History 
In 1905 in Oakland, California, 11-year-old Francis William "Frank" Epperson was mixing a powdered flavoring for soft drinks with water. He accidentally left it on the back porch overnight, with a stirring stick still in it. That night, the temperature dropped below freezing, and the next morning, Epperson discovered the drink had frozen to the stick, inspiring the idea of a fruit-flavored "Popsicle".

In 1922, he introduced the creation at a fireman's ball, where according to reports it was "a sensation". In 1923, Epperson began selling the frozen pops to the public at Neptune Beach, an amusement park in Alameda, California. By 1924 Epperson had received a patent for his "frozen confectionery" which he called "the Epsicle ice pop". He renamed it to Popsicle, allegedly at the insistence of his children. Popsicles were originally sold in fruity flavors and marketed as a "frozen drink on a stick."

Lawsuit and sale 
Six months after receiving a patent for the Popsicle, Good Humor sued Popsicle Corporation. By October 1925, the parties settled out of court. Popsicle agreed to pay Good Humor a license fee to manufacture what was called frozen suckers from ice and sherbet products. Good Humor reserved the right to manufacture these products from ice cream, frozen custard, and the like.

In 1925, Epperson sold the rights to the Popsicle to the Joe Lowe Company of New York. "I was flat and had to liquidate all my assets," he recalled years later. "I haven't been the same since."

In 1989, Good Humor, now a subsidiary of Unilever, bought the rights to the Popsicle.

Popsicle Pete
In April 1939, Popsicle Pete was introduced on the radio program Buck Rogers in the 25th Century as having won the "Typical American Boy Contest." The character told listeners that they could win presents by sending wrappers from Popsicle products to the manufacturer. Pete continued to appear in the company's advertising campaigns for 50 years. During the 1940s, Popsicle Pete ads were created by Woody Gelman and his partner Ben Solomon, and appeared on Popsicle brand packages for decades.

Products

The Popsicle brand began expanding from its original flavors after being purchased by Good Humor-Breyers in 1989. Under the Popsicle brand, Good Humor-Breyers holds the trademark for both Creamsicle and Fudgsicle. Creamsicle's center is vanilla ice cream, covered by a layer of flavored ice. Fudgsicle, originally sold as Fudgicle, is a flat, frozen dessert that comes on a stick and is chocolate-flavored with a texture somewhat similar to ice cream.

Firecrackers are a brand of Popsicles that come in a shape resembling a firecracker. These take a similar appearance to Wells Dairy's Blue Bunny's Bomb Pop. Slow Melt Pops include a small amount of gelatin that helps them stay frozen longer than traditional ice pops. Slow Melt Pops are available in several varieties.

Yosicles are a brand of Popsicle that contain yogurt. Revello Bars are chocolate covered ice cream on a stick.

Fruit Twisters are a brand of Popsicle that have fruit juice, milk and cane sugar.

See also
 Fab (brand)
 Ice cream bar
 Ice pop
 List of frozen dessert brands
 Italian ice
 Míša

Notes

References

External links

 
 Original patent

Brand name frozen desserts
Brands that became generic
Products introduced in 1905
Unilever brands